Erythrina berteroana is a species of small deciduous tree in the family Fabaceae. It is found in Mexico, Central America and the northern part of South America. Common names include elequeme, gallito, machete, pernila de casa, pito and poró de cerca. It is a common tree in the drier parts of its range and has many traditional uses.

Description

The branches are smooth and thorny. The flowers are pink or red, appearing at the same time as the leaves. They are large and tubular, each with a banner, wings and keels, nine stamens bunched together and one free, and a long pistil. The tree usually blooms from December to March, with pollination being performed by hummingbirds, usually by long-billed starthroats (Heliomaster longirostris).

Distribution and habitat
Erythrina berteroana is native to southern Mexico, Central America, Guatemala and Venezuela. It prefers acidic soils (to pH 4) and tolerates high levels of aluminium in the soil. It flourishes in a range of temperatures and is probably frost resistant.

Uses
Probably the most common lowland tree in the drier parts of Central America, it has many uses. The shoots and unopened flowers are cooked as a vegetable, and the young foliage is used as fodder for cattle. Cut branches are thrust into the ground to take root and grow into living fencing posts. The roots have nitrogen-fixing nodules which enrich the soil. The tree provides shade in coffee plantations and is used as living stakes for growing yams and chayote. The leaves make a useful mulch. The bark and seeds contain toxic alkaloids and can be used to prepare a poison. The timber is lightweight and coarse, but can be carved into objects and used like cork. A yellow dye can be extracted from the bark, and the flowers, leaves and bark are used in traditional medicine.

References

berteroana